Eupithecia jermyi is a moth in the family Geometridae. It is found in China (Fujian) and Vietnam.

References

Moths described in 1976
jermyi
Moths of Asia